East Honiara is a parliamentary constituency electing one representative to the National Parliament of Solomon Islands. With an electorate of 30,049 in 2006, it is by far the most heavily populated constituency in the country, being the only one (out of fifty) to consist in more than 20,000 voters. It is one of three parliamentary constituencies in the country's capital city, Honiara - the other two being Central Honiara and West Honiara.

The constituency has existed since the first Parliament in 1976. Its first MP was Bartholomew Ulufa’alu, who was later to become Prime Minister.

Charles Dausabea was elected in the 2006 general election, but subsequently lost his seat was he was convicted and jailed for fraud. This precipitated a bye-election, which Silas Milikada won with 3,453 votes.

Opinion polls suggested that Auditor General Edward Ronia was the most popular candidate to take the seat in the 2010 general election. Ultimately, however, he did not stand. There were twelve candidates for the seat, including nine independents, two rival candidates from OUR Party, and one (Douglas Ete) from the Reformed Democratic Party. Ete won by an overwhelming margin, obtaining 3,178 votes, ahead of second-placed former MP Charles Dausabea (OUR Party), who obtained 958 votes. Voter turnout, however, was only 19%.

Members of Parliament by year
The following MPs have represented East Honiara in the National Parliament.

References

Legislative Assembly of the Solomon Islands constituencies
Solomon Islands parliamentary constituencies
1976 establishments in the Solomon Islands
Constituencies established in 1976